This article lists medical eponyms which have been associated with Nazi human experimentation or Nazi politics. While normally eponyms used in medicine serve to honor the memory of the physician or researcher who first documented a disease or pioneered a procedure, the propriety of such names resulting from unethical research practices is controversial. In some cases terms closely related to doctors in the Nazi era have fallen out of favor or there are active lobbying efforts to remove the original name from use. In other cases their use in the medical literature is sometimes presented with a caveat or footnote.

The declining use of the Nazi-era eponyms has itself been tracked in the literature.  Since 2007, the Israel Medical Association Journal and European Neurology have each published articles cataloging eponyms honoring Nazis and their collaborators.  While the most direct Nazi experimenters (such as Josef Mengele) were never honored, others who were members of the Nazi party or whose research relied upon the Nazi program—such as conducting research on the remains of Nazi execution victims—have been honored.

Some physicians have used the Nazi associations as an argument to discontinue the use of eponyms in medical naming conventions altogether, while others have argued that such Nazi-associated eponyms should be retained as "a means of conveying immortal dishonor." Both the Israel Medical Association Journal and European Neurology articles advocated that eponyms honoring victims of the Nazis be retained, while eponyms honoring Nazi collaborators or benefactors be replaced.

List of eponyms

References

External links
 Eponyms and the Nazi Era: Time to Remember and Time for Change R.D. Strous and M.C. Edelman

Nazi human subject research
Nazi
Medical eponyms